Edward Walker may refer to:

 Edward Walker (cricketer) (1816–1857), English academic and cricketer
 Edward Walker (mathematician) (1820–1893), English applied mathematician
 Edward Walker (officer of arms) (1611–1677), British officer of arms
 Edward Walker (politician) (born 1969), Republican member of the Montana Legislature
 Edward Alexander Walker (1864–1946), American Medal of Honor recipient
 Edward C. Walker (New York politician) (1837–1903), New York politician
 E. C. Walker (1820–1894), Michigan politician
 Edward Craven Walker (1918–2000), inventor of the Lava Lamp
 Edward F. Walker (1852–1918), General Superintendent of the Church of the Nazarene
 Edward Forbes Walker (1876–?), rugby union international
 Edward G. Walker (1830–1901), American artisan and attorney
 Edward Noël Walker (1842–1908), acting Governor of British Ceylon
 Edward Ronald Walker (1907–1988), known as Sir Ronald Walker, Australian economist and diplomat
 Edward S. Walker Jr. (born 1940), former U.S. Assistant Secretary of State, Ambassador and president of the Middle East Institute
 Ted Walker (1934–2004), English poet

See also
 Edward Forestier-Walker (1812–1881), British Army officer
 Ed Walker (disambiguation)
 Edward Waller (disambiguation)